Ulrich III (after 1286 – 11 July 1344) Count of Württemberg from 1325 until 1344.

Career

Ulrich was already strongly involved in politics during the reign of his father Eberhard I. In 1319 he handled a treaty with King Frederick I, the Handsome. He renewed this treaty after assuming reign in 1325, when Württemberg had temporarily joined sides with Louis IV. Both Louis and Frederick claimed power in the Holy Roman Empire at this time. After their reconciliation it was possible for Ulrich to be bound closely to the Holy Roman Empire, even after the death of Frederick I. This and his regional policy of pacts and acquisitions helped strongly to enlarge Württemberg's territory substantially. Besides several gains in Alsace, the purchase of Markgröningen 1336 and Tübingen 1342 are notable.  He died in Alsace.

Marriage and children
Ulrich was married to Sophie of Pfirt. Sons from this marriage were Eberhard II the Jarrer and Ulrich IV, who ruled together with his brother until 1361.

13th-century births
1344 deaths
14th-century counts of Württemberg
Year of birth unknown